Edward Santana (born September 14, 1980) is a Dominican basketball player for Cañeros de La Romana and the Dominican national team, where he participated at the 2014 FIBA Basketball World Cup.

References

1987 births
Living people
Dominican Republic men's basketball players
Power forwards (basketball)
Basketball players at the 2015 Pan American Games
Small forwards
Pan American Games competitors for the Dominican Republic
2014 FIBA Basketball World Cup players